Tango is a social live-streaming app available on Android, iOS, and Web for content creators. As of 2023, Tango has more than 450 Million registered users and is one of the top western social live-streaming platforms, with content from live performances to DIY, gaming, and more. 

Tango’s platform allows creators to live-stream their content, reach a large global audience, and earn a sustainable income through in-app gifts. 

The app’s features include virtual AR Gifts and filters, live games, events, battles, and parties with people around the world. As of 2018, Tango has over 40 patents involving advancements in live moderation tools and machine learning technologies.

Tango has 400+ employees globally, with offices in Dubai, Kyiv, Limassol, Warsaw, and Tel Aviv, and is available in over 170 countries worldwide.

Features 
Live Streaming

Live Streaming allows people to share special moments, display their talents, and get virtual gifts from fans.

Creators can share music videos with Youtube integration, using picture-in-picture multi-streaming.

On the explore page, viewers can watch trending content and customize their experience with the customization filter, allowing them to find content based on their interests. 

Special Effects

Tango uses AR technologies to provide tools for Creators to express themselves through various video filters, masks, gifts, and live effects.

Live Parties & Battles

Creators can live-stream together with up to 3 others for viewing parties, special events, and battles. 

In Live Battles, Creators receive gifts from their supporters, and those with the most gifts win.

Audio-Only Streaming

Creators can live-stream in Audio-only mode.

Socialize with Chat & Feed

Tango allows users to post updates, make announcements, share photos and videos, and communicate directly with individual followers when they’re not streaming through the in-app chat and feed.

History 
TangoMe, Inc. was founded in September 2009 by Uri Raz and Eric Setton and was the first to introduce the world to cross-network and cross-platform mobile video chats.

In 2015, Tango organically reached over 300 Million registered users.

In 2017, the company entered live streaming and became a leading B2C social live video app, combining enhanced video technology, content moderation, and in-app digital transactions. 

By 2018, Tango secured over 40 patents in technologies and moderation tools.

As of 2023, Tango is powered by 400 global employees in 5 offices worldwide.

References

External links

Android (operating system) software
Cross-platform software
IOS software
Social networking services
Videotelephony
VoIP companies of the United States
VoIP services
VoIP software
Windows Phone software
Companies based in Palo Alto, California
2009 establishments in California